Lamotte Township is one of ten townships in Crawford County, Illinois, USA.  As of the 2010 census, its population was 2,046 and it contained 995 housing units.  Its name changed from Palestine Township sometime before 1921.

Geography
The Wabash River defines its eastern border.

Cities, towns, villages
 Palestine

Unincorporated towns
 Gordon
 Richwoods
 Trimble
(This list is based on USGS data and may include former settlements.)

Cemeteries
The township contains these seven cemeteries: Barbee, East Union, Green, Higgins, Kitchell, Neathery and Oak Grove.

Major highways
  Illinois Route 33

Airports and landing strips
 Robinson Municipal Airport

Landmarks
 Leaverton Park

Demographics

School districts
 Hutsonville Community Unit School District 1
 Palestine Community Unit School District 3
 Robinson Community Unit School District 2
 Oblong Community Unit School District 4

Political districts
 Illinois's 15th congressional district
 State House District 109
 State Senate District 55

References
 
 United States Census Bureau 2007 TIGER/Line Shapefiles
 United States National Atlas

External links
 City-Data.com
 Illinois State Archives

Townships in Crawford County, Illinois
Townships in Illinois